The 2019 SheBelieves Cup was the fourth edition of the SheBelieves Cup, an invitational women's soccer tournament held in the United States. Featuring national teams from Brazil, England, Japan, and hosts United States, it began on February 27 and ended on March 5, 2019. Having kept the same four teams in the first three editions, 2019 was the first time that France and Germany had not taken part. They were instead replaced by Japan and Brazil, the first time teams from either the AFC or CONMEBOL had taken part.

The United States were the defending champions. England won the tournament for the first time.

Format
The four invited teams played a round-robin tournament. Points awarded in the group stage followed the formula of three points for a win, one point for a draw, and zero points for a loss. A tie in points would be decided by goal differential; other tie-breakers are listed below.

Venues

Squads

Teams

Standings

Results

Goalscorers

References

2019
2019 in women's association football
2019 in American women's soccer
2018–19 in English women's football
2019 in Brazilian football
2019 in Japanese women's sport
2019 in Japanese football
March 2019 sports events in the United States
February 2019 sports events in the United States
2019 in sports in Florida
2019 in sports in Pennsylvania
2019 in sports in Tennessee
Sports competitions in Tampa, Florida
Chester, Pennsylvania
Sports competitions in Nashville, Tennessee
Soccer in Florida
Soccer in Pennsylvania
Soccer in Tennessee